William Edward Wegman (born December 19, 1962) is a former Major League Baseball pitcher.

After graduating from Oak Hills High School, Wegman was drafted by the Milwaukee Brewers in the 5th round of the 1981 amateur draft, where he played throughout his entire 11-year career, ending on October 1, 1995. In 1983, Wegman won the Ray Scarborough Award as the Brewers' Minor League Player of the Year. Wegman won a career-high 15 games in 1991, with a 2.84 earned run average.

See also
List of Major League Baseball players who spent their entire career with one franchise

References

External links

Retrosheet

Major League Baseball pitchers
Milwaukee Brewers players
Baseball players from Cincinnati
1962 births
Living people